The Sir Solomon Hochoy Highway, sometimes referred to as SHH, is the major north–south highway on the island of Trinidad, in Trinidad and Tobago. It runs for 35.6 km (22.1 mi).  

It connects Chaguanas with Gandhi Village, Debe.  It meets the Uriah Butler Highway at Chaguanas.  

The highway was named for Sir Solomon Hochoy, the first Caribbean-born Governor of Trinidad and Tobago and the first Governor General of Trinidad and Tobago.  Originally constructed as a two-lane highway in the early 1970s, it was expanded to a four-lane dual carriageway in the late 1970s.

Description

Route 
The Sir Solomon Hochoy Highway begins at Chaguanas, where traffic joins the Uriah Butler Highway. The highway begins as a four lane expressway at the Southern Main Road interchange, in the center of Chaguanas. It then runs past Brentwood/Edinburgh 500 with access from the southbound lane. The highway continues past Chase Village and Freeport, both accessed by interchanges. At Couva, a more advanced interchange provides access to Couva, Preysal, Gran Couva and Point Lisas via Rivulet Road. The highway continues south through a sparsely settled hilly area before meeting Cedar Hill Road, providing access to Claxton Bay and Tortuga. It then passes the community of Macaulay, with partial access, and then Gasparillo.  

As the highway nears San Fernando, it passes the Brian Lara Cricket Academy and Gasparillo Bypass Road, before providing access to Tarouba and the San Fernando Bypass at the Tarouba Link Road interchange. Further south and on the newest section of the highway, the Naparima Mayaro Road bridges over the highway just before the Corinth Interchange, which provides access to Corinth, Pleasantville and Cocoyea. The Golconda Interchange provides access to Golconda and San Fernando via the Golconda Connector Road. After San Fernando, the highway comes to an end soon after passing the Debe interchange, and terminates at a temporary roundabout upon meeting Gandhi Village Road.

Features 
For its entire length, the highway is a four-lane expressway that is entirely grade separated with the exception of the temporary southern terminus. The speed limit on the entire route is 100 kilometers per hour. It can be considered the most modern highway in the country and is up to international freeway standards.

Exit list
The following table lists the major junctions along the Sir Solomon Hochoy Highway. The entire route is located in Trinidad.

Auxiliary Routes 

 Connector Road, Chase Village
 Rivulet Road
 Gasparillo Bypass Road
 Tarouba Link Road
 Golconda Connector Road

Upgrades and Extensions 
In 2001, work commenced on making the highway bypass San Fernando completely. This work was completed in 2003.

Further work was done in 2013 extending the highway to Debe while en route to Point Fortin. Plans are underway to extend the highway to Point Fortin. Numerous upgrades to the interchanges along the highway occurred in recent years, most notably the Golconda and Couva/Preysal interchanges.
 The highway's current extended route will be discontiguous from the main route as the Debe to Mon Desir segment of the highway is not currently planned to be constructed by the current administration.

References

Roads in Trinidad and Tobago
Trinidad (island)